Napoleon II, the Eagle (French: Napoléon II, l'Aiglon, in English Napoleon II, the eaglet (or young eagle)) is a 1961 French historical drama film directed by Claude Boissol  and starring Bernard Verley, Jean Marais and Danièle Gaubert. The scenario was written by Paul Andréota and based on a novel of André Castelot.  The film's sets were designed by the art director Wolf Witzemann.

Synopsis
The film portrays the life of Napoleon II, considered Emperor of France by Bonapartists, who lived most of his life in Vienna under the title the Duke of Reichstadt.

Cast 
 Bernard Verley as Duke of Reichstadt
 Jean-Pierre Cassel as Gustav von Neipperg
 René Dary as Dietrichstein
 Danièle Gaubert as Thérèse Pèche
 Jean Marais as General de Montholon
 Georges Marchal as General Neipperg
 Liliane Patrick as Countess Camerata
 Jean-Marc Thibault as Napoleon I
 Paul Hubschmid as Prokesch
 Jacques Jouanneau as Esterhazy
 Marianne Koch as Empress Marie-Louise
 Josef Meinrad as Emperor Francis II
 Sabine Sinjen as Archduchess Sophie
 Paul Cambo as Ambassador of France
 Jean-Pascal Duffard as the 7-year-old duke
 François Maistre as Metternich
 Yves Bocquillon as the 3-year-old duke
 Jacques Fabbri as Doctor Malfati
 Raymond Gérôme as Apponyi
 Anthony Stuart as Lord Crowley, ambassador of England
 René Clermont

References

Bibliography
 Goble, Alan. The Complete Index to Literary Sources in Film. Walter de Gruyter, 1999.

External links 
 
 Napoléon II, l'aiglon (1961) at the Films de France

1961 films
1960s French-language films
Films directed by Claude Boissol
Films set in the 1810s
Films set in the 1820s
Films set in the 1830s
Depictions of Napoleon on film
Cultural depictions of Klemens von Metternich
1960s historical drama films
French historical drama films
1960s French films
Pathé films
Films based on Belgian novels
Films set in Vienna